Giang Trần Quách Tân (born 8 March 1992) is a Vietnamese footballer who plays as a winger for V-League (Vietnam) club Hồng Lĩnh Hà Tĩnh.

References 

1992 births
Living people
Vietnamese footballers
Association football wingers
V.League 1 players
SHB Da Nang FC players
Than Quang Ninh FC players
People from Da Nang
Footballers at the 2014 Asian Games
Asian Games competitors for Vietnam